Gaisilat or Gaisilet is a block in Bargarh District, Odisha, India.

Odisha